Cyphellostereum is a genus of basidiolichens. Species produce white, somewhat cup-shaped fruit bodies on a thin film of green on soil which is the thallus.  All Cyphellostereum species have nonamyloid spores and tissues, lack clamp connections, and also lack hymenial cystidia.

DNA research has shown that a common, north temperate species formerly known as Cyphellostereum laeve is not related to the type species and belongs in a quite separate order, the Hymenochaetales. It has been renamed Muscinupta laevis.

Etymology

The name Cyphellostereum combines two generic names: Cyphella in reference to the inverted cupulate form (like the genus Cyphella); and Stereum, in reference to the stipitate fan-shape or bracket shape (as in species of Stereum).

Species
Cyphellostereum bicolor 
Cyphellostereum brasiliense 
Cyphellostereum galapagoense 
Cyphellostereum georgianum 
Cyphellostereum imperfectum 
Cyphellostereum jamesianum 
Cyphellostereum muscicola 
Cyphellostereum phyllogenum 
Cyphellostereum rivulorum 
Cyphellostereum unoquinoum 
Cyphellostereum ushimanum  – Japan

See also
List of Agaricales genera

References

Agaricales genera
Lichen genera
Hygrophoraceae
Basidiolichens
Taxa described in 1965
Taxa named by Derek Reid